Al Williams may refer to:

Al Williams (1930s pitcher) (1914–1969), Major League Baseball pitcher
Al Williams (1940s pitcher), Negro league baseball pitcher
Al Williams (basketball) (1948–2007), American basketball player
Al Williams (wrestler), American professional wrestler
Al Williams (politician) (born 1947), American politician in Georgia
Albert Lynn Williams (1911–1982), American business executive
Al Williams (author), blogger for Dr. Dobb's Journal
Al Williams (aviator), 1930s display pilot of Grumman F3F
Al Williams (gridiron football) (born 1961), football player

See also
Alan Williams (disambiguation)
Albert Williams (disambiguation)
Alexander Williams (disambiguation)
Alfred Williams (disambiguation)